Jonatan Nahuel Valle (born January 26, 1993 in Santa Fe, Argentina), is a professional Argentine footballer who currently plays for Cimarrones de Sonora.

References

1993 births
Living people
Argentine footballers
Argentine expatriate footballers
Cimarrones de Sonora players
Ascenso MX players
Association football defenders
Argentine expatriate sportspeople in Mexico
Expatriate footballers in Mexico
Footballers from Santa Fe, Argentina